The Hillsborough County Courthouse was constructed in 1892 in the block bounded by Madison Street, Lafayette Street (now Kennedy Boulevard), Florida Avenue, and Franklin Street. This replaced an older courthouse in the same place. Designed by John A. Wood, it included some of the Moorish architectural styles and domes similar to the Tampa Bay Hotel, which was also designed by Wood, across the Hillsborough River. It was demolished in 1953 and replaced with the current Hillsborough County Courthouse, four blocks to the east.

Gallery

References

Buildings and structures in Tampa, Florida
Government buildings completed in 1892
1892 establishments in Florida
1953 disestablishments in Florida
Buildings and structures demolished in 1953
Demolished buildings and structures in Florida